Built to Last is a 1989 album by the Grateful Dead.

Built to Last may also refer to:

 Durability
 Built to Last (Hogan's Heroes album), 1988
 Built to Last: Successful Habits of Visionary Companies, 1994 management book
 Built to Last (TV series), 1997 NBC sitcom
 Built to Last (Sick of It All album), 1997
 Built to Last (Maestro album), 1998
 Built to Last, a 2006 album by Damian Marshall
 "Built to Last" (Mêlée song), 2007
 Built to Last (The Rippingtons album), 2012
 Built to Last (HammerFall album), 2016